Yang Wai Kam (born 23 June 1964) is a Hong Kong diver. He competed in the men's 3 metre springboard event at the 1984 Summer Olympics.

References

External links
 

1964 births
Living people
Hong Kong male divers
Olympic divers of Hong Kong
Divers at the 1984 Summer Olympics
Place of birth missing (living people)